A.P. Anil Kumar is an Indian politician and indian national congress leader from Malappuram district.
He is a former minister of Kerala and current M.L.A. of Wandoor assembly constituency since 2001.

Early life
Son of A.P. Balan and Devakiamma he was born on 15th March 1965 at Malappuram District.
He completed B.A.  Political Science.

Political career

A.P. Anil Kumar started his political career in the Kerala Students Union and was the State Secretary of the Indian Youth Congress. In 2001, he was elected by the Wandoor Constituency to the Kerala Legislative Assembly and later became Minister with portfolios of social, cultural, and youth affairs in the Oommen Chandy Ministry in 2004. He was re-elected to the Legislative Assembly in 2006 and 2011. He was a member of the Executive committee of Kerala Agricultural University during 2002-04 and the Student welfare committee chairman. He has now completed 20 years as MLA in Wandoor town.

Political Positions

1979 KSU Unit President
1982 KSU Taluk President
1984 KSU District Secretary Malappuram
1986 Youth Congress Malappuram District Vice President, State General Secretary
2001, 2006, 2011, 2016 Wandoor MLA
2004-2006 Minister for the Welfare of Scheduled Communities and Youth Cultural affairs
2011-2016 Minister for Backward Communities and Tourism

References 

Living people
1965 births
People from Malappuram district
Kerala MLAs 2006–2011
Kerala MLAs 2016–2021
Indian National Congress politicians
Indian National Congress politicians from Kerala